Qarqoli Cham (also Romanized as Qārqolī Cham; also known as Kargulicham, Qarehqūlīcham, Qārghūlīcham, and Qārqūlī Cham) is a village in Gilvan Rural District, in the Central District of Tarom County, Zanjan Province, Iran. At the 2006 census, its population was 662, in 159 families.

References 

Populated places in Tarom County